American Made is a 2017 American action comedy film directed by Doug Liman, written by Gary Spinelli, and starring Tom Cruise, Domhnall Gleeson, Sarah Wright, Alejandro Edda, Mauricio Mejía, Caleb Landry Jones, and Jesse Plemons. It is inspired by the life of Barry Seal, a former TWA pilot who flew missions for the CIA, and became a drug smuggler for the Medellín Cartel in the 1980s. In order to avoid jail time, Seal became an informant for the DEA.

The film was first released in Taiwan on August 18, 2017, and then in the United States on September 29, 2017. It is the first film directed by Liman to be released by Universal Pictures since The Bourne Identity in 2002, and played in 2D and IMAX in select theaters. It grossed $134 million worldwide  and received generally positive reviews from critics, who praised Cruise's performance.

Plot
In 1978, Baton Rouge pilot Barry Seal, who flies commercial jets for TWA, is recruited by a CIA case officer calling himself Monty Schafer. He asks Seal, who has been smuggling Cuban cigars into the country via Canada, to fly clandestine reconnaissance missions for the CIA over Central America using a small, fast, twin-engine Piper Smith Aerostar 600, outfitted with sophisticated aerial surveillance cameras. Seal tells his wife, Lucy, he's still with TWA.

In the 1980s, Schafer asks Seal to start acting as a courier between the CIA and General Noriega in Panama. During a mission, the Medellín Cartel picks Seal up and asks him to fly cocaine on his return flights to the United States. Seal accepts and starts flying the cartel's cocaine to Louisiana, delivering the drugs via airdrop in the countryside instead of landing at an airport. The CIA turns a blind eye to the drug smuggling, but the DEA tracks Seal down. To avoid the authorities, Seal and his family must relocate to the remote town of Mena, Arkansas, and his wife comes to accept the wealth generated by his new life. The small town gradually becomes wealthy as the hub of U.S. cocaine trafficking.

Later, Schafer asks Seal to run guns to the Nicaraguan Contras based in Honduras. Seal realizes that the Contras are not serious about the war and just want to get rich and he starts trading the guns to the cartel. The CIA sets up a Contra training base in Mena and Seal flies the Contras in, but many of them escape as soon as they arrive.

Seal makes so much money he buries it in suitcases in the backyard. Seal's freeloading brother-in-law JB moves in, needing a job. Eventually, he starts stealing money from the Seals and is arrested after Sheriff Joe Downing catches him with a briefcase full of laundered cash. With JB out on bail, Seal gives him money and a plane ticket to Bora Bora and tells him to get lost for his safety. JB demands weekly cash and insults Lucy. As Barry chases after him, JB is killed in his car by a bomb placed by the Medellín Cartel, who had previously promised to "take care" of the JB problem.

The FBI soon catches wind of the sudden exuberance on the streets of Mena, not helped by JB's reckless spending, and eventually, the CIA shuts the program down and abandons Seal, who is arrested by the FBI, DEA, ATF and Arkansas State Police simultaneously. Seal escapes prosecution by making a deal with the White House, which wants evidence of the Sandinistas being drug traffickers. They ask Seal to get photos that tie the Medellín Cartel to the Nicaraguan Sandinistas. Seal manages to get the pictures, but the White House releases them as propaganda against the Sandinistas. Seal is prominently shown in the pictures, which leads to his indictment by the crusading state attorney general, and the cartel plotting revenge.

Seal is convicted but sentenced to only 1,000 hours of community service. Moving from motel to motel making video recordings of his experiences, Seal fears an explosion anytime he starts his car. As his community service is performed at the same Salvation Army building every night, Seal cannot hide from the cartel and is shot dead by assassins. The CIA destroys all evidence connecting them to Seal. After Seal is dead, the CIA continues smuggling, instead using Iran to get guns to the Contras, as proposed by Schafer.

The film ends with Schafer getting promoted for his idea, though it is soon discovered by the public with reporters asking President Reagan and Vice President Bush about the scandal. Lucy and her kids move back to Baton Rouge, where she is seen contentedly working in fast food. One of her expensive pieces of jewelry is seen on her wrist.

Cast
 Tom Cruise as Barry Seal
 Domhnall Gleeson as Monty 'Schafer'
 Sarah Wright as Lucy Seal
 Jesse Plemons as Sheriff Downing
 Caleb Landry Jones as JB
 Lola Kirke as Judy Downing
 Jayma Mays as Dana Sibota
 Alejandro Edda as Jorge Ochoa
 Benito Martinez as James Rangel
 E. Roger Mitchell as Agent Craig McCall
 Jed Rees as Louis Finkle
 Fredy Yate as Carlos Lehder
 Mauricio Mejía as Pablo Escobar
 Connor Trinneer as George W. Bush
 Alberto Ospino as Manuel Antonio Noriega

Production

Development
In the summer of 2013, screenwriter Gary Spinelli was looking for a project that was based on real events. On the bonus feature of American Made, Spinelli said:

The film was originally titled Mena and in 2014 was featured on The Black List, a survey showcasing the best unproduced screenplays in Hollywood. On January 14, 2015, it was announced that Tom Cruise and Edge of Tomorrow Director Doug Liman would reunite for what was originally titled Mena.

Casting
Sarah Wright, Jayma Mays and Domhnall Gleeson were added to the cast in April. Jesse Plemons, Caleb Landry Jones and Lola Kirke were added to the cast in May 2015.

Filming
Principal photography on the film began on May 18, 2015 in Atlanta, Georgia. Filming locations there include counties Cherokee, Clayton, DeKalb, Fulton, Gwinnett, Morgan and Pickens. Filming on the Georgia Unit wrapped on July 12, 2015. On August 20, 2015, Cruise arrived in Medellin, Colombia, and on August 31, in Santa Marta to scout filming locations for the film. Filming in Colombia commenced on August 26, 2015 and wrapped on September 11, 2015. Production on the film resumed February 3, 2016 in New Orleans, Louisiana as filming has been suspended due to a plane crash in Colombia that occurred in September 2015. Reshoots occurred in late January 2017 in Atlanta, Georgia.

Plane crash
A plane crash on the set of the film in Colombia on September 11, 2015, killed two people and caused serious injuries to another member of the crew. The plane (a twin-engine Piper Aerostar), which was carrying crew members (three American pilots), was returning to Enrique Olaya Herrera Airport in Medellín when it ran into bad weather and the crash occurred. The dead were identified as Carlos Berl and Alan Purwin, who was the founder and president of Helinet Aviation, a company which provides aerial surveillance technology to government agencies and law enforcement, and a film pilot who had worked in top films. American pilot Jimmy Lee Garland was seriously injured and rushed to a local hospital.

Release
In May 2015, Universal set the film for release on January 6, 2017. On August 8, 2016, the film's release was pushed to September 29, 2017, and its title changed from Mena to American Made. It was released in Europe on August 23, 2017, and in the United States on September 29, 2017, and also screened at the Deauville Film Festival on September 1, 2017.

Reception

Box office
American Made grossed $51.3 million in the United States and Canada, and $83.6 million in other territories, for a worldwide total of $134.9 million, against a production budget of $50 million.

In North America, American Made was released alongside the openings of Flatliners and 'Til Death Do Us Part, as well as the wide expansion of Battle of the Sexes, and was projected to gross $12–15 million from 3,023 theaters in its opening weekend. It made $960,000 from Thursday night previews, the lowest total by a Cruise-led film in recent years, and $6.1 million on its first day. Initially, studio estimates had the film opening to $17 million, finishing third at the box office, behind holdovers It ($17.3 million) and Kingsman: The Golden Circle ($17 million). The following day, actual results had the film debuting to $16.8 million, with Kingsman beating out It by a gross of $16.93 million to $16.90 million. 91% of its opening weekend audience was over the age of 25. In its second weekend, the film grossed $8.1 million (a drop of 51%), finishing 6th.

The film was released in 21 countries on August 25, 2017, and grossed a total of $6.1 million over the weekend. It finished number one in 11 of the territories, including the UK, where it replaced five-time champ Dunkirk.

Critical response
On Rotten Tomatoes, the film has an approval rating of 85% based on 273 reviews, with an average rating of 6.95/10. The site's critical consensus states, "American Mades fast-and-loose attitude with its real-life story mirrors the cavalier – and delightfully watchable – energy Tom Cruise gives off in the leading role." On Metacritic the film has a weighted average score of 65 out of 100, based on reviews from 50 critics, indicating "generally favorable reviews". Audiences polled by CinemaScore gave the film an average grade of "B+" on an A+ to F scale, while PostTrak reported filmgoers gave it a 55% "definite recommend".

Varietys Guy Lodge wrote: "A sweat-slicked, exhausting but glibly entertaining escapade on its own terms, American Made is more interesting as a showcase for the dateless elasticity of Cruise's star power. It feels, for better or worse, like a film he could have made at almost any point in the last 30 years."
Leslie Felperin of The Hollywood Reporter wrote: "This is yet another hyper-competent, boyishly devil-may-care character that offers Cruise, famous for his derring-do on set, a chance to do his own stunts and fly a plane; it's not a role all that far out of the ageing megastar's wheelhouse."

Historical accuracy

Despite the film's suggestion that he was recruited by the CIA while working for TWA, Seal denied in court that he had ever worked for the CIA. Monty Schafer was a fictional character and not based on a real-life CIA agent. A 1996 report by the CIA inspector general acknowledged that the agency had conducted a covert training exercise at the Mena Intermountain Municipal Airport with another federal agency, but found no evidence that the agency had been involved in any illegal activities.

Seal was fired from TWA in 1974 for falsely claiming medical leave when he was involved in a smuggling scheme. Seal's connections with cartel bosses were also not direct when he was running his drug operations, and he did not meet Pablo Escobar and the Ochoa brothers in person until 1984, when he was working as an informant for the DEA on an undercover operation, following his arrest.

His third wife Deborah, whom Lucy was loosely based on, stated that Seal started his drug smuggling business in 1975, not 1980 like the film suggests, and that it was centered around marijuana before it involved cocaine. Seal's DEA record also noted that he expanded to smuggling cocaine in 1978 and claimed that he was smuggling marijuana as early as 1976. Additionally, Seal's ties to the Medellín Cartel did not begin after being kidnapped while refueling his plane in Colombia, but when he met a smuggler who flew for cartel operative Jorge Ochoa during a flight home from Honduras where he served nine months in a local jail after being caught smuggling drugs in 1979.

When asked by Abraham Riesman of Vulture if the film was a biopic, director Doug Liman said "You know, we're not making a biopic. Tom Cruise doesn't look like Barry Seal. His character is inspired by the stories we learned about Barry." (Barry Seal weighed 300 pounds (140 kg) only later in his life, weight probably taken from a morgue report after his death, there are multiple pictures of him weighing much less)

Liman has also acknowledged that the film's zero-gravity love scene was his idea and that he received the inspiration for it after he and Cruise collided in the cockpit while filming a flight scene.

Seal was unapologetic about his weapons and drug smuggling operations, even stating once in a television interview, "Whether you call it soldier of fortune or what, it's a way of life for me. I enjoy it and I'm going to keep doing it." He also never crash-landed into a suburban neighborhood. Liman has described the film as "a fun lie based on a true story."

References

External links
 
 

2017 films
2017 action comedy films
American aviation films
American action comedy films
American historical action films
2010s English-language films
2010s spy films
Cold War aviation films
Films about the Central Intelligence Agency
Films about the illegal drug trade
Bureau of Alcohol, Tobacco, Firearms and Explosives in fiction
Films directed by Doug Liman
Films produced by Brian Grazer
Films produced by Brian Oliver
Films scored by Christophe Beck
Films shot in Atlanta
Films shot in Georgia (U.S. state)
Films shot in Colombia
Films shot in New Orleans
Films set in Arkansas
Films set in Colombia
Films set in Louisiana
Films set in Nicaragua
Films set in Honduras
Films set in the 1970s
Films set in 1978
Films set in 1979
Films set in the 1980s
Films set in 1980
Films set in 1981
Films set in 1982
Films set in 1983
Films set in 1984
Films set in 1985
Films set in 1986
Universal Pictures films
Cross Creek Pictures films
Imagine Entertainment films
IMAX films
Cultural depictions of George W. Bush
Cultural depictions of Pablo Escobar
Biographical films about criminals
2010s American films